Utopia is a genus of longhorn beetles in the tribe Cerambycini, erected by J. Thomson, 1864.

This appears to be a monotypic genus containing the species Utopia castelnaudi J. Thomson, 1864, which occurs in Borneo and Sumatra.

References

External links
 
 

Cerambycidae genera
Beetles of Asia
Cerambycini